Bermúdez is the name and brand of a variety of rums from the Dominican Republic produced by J. Armando Bermúdez & Co., S.A. Bermúdez and the other Dominican rums, Barceló and Brugal, are collectively known as the three B's. Bermúdez has its distillery in Santiago de los Caballeros.

History
The origin of Bermúdez goes back to 1852, eight years after the declaration of independence and foundation of the Dominican Republic, when Don Erasmo Bermúdez created the formula of the Bitter Panacea, a rum to be taken as appetizing that soon became famous.

Until 1927 the entity was ruled by Don Armando Bermúdez, who turned it into an industry of national projection under the name of "Unrivaled Liquors Manufacture". Later, when it turned into a stock company under the present name of J. Armando Bermúdez & Co., C. por A. reached its character of national institution under the ruling of Domingo O. Bermúdez.

The fourth generation of managers arrived in 1967, presently represented by Don Carlos Alberto Bermúdez Pippa, who runs the company under the same industrial, commercial and of service principles left by their founders.

Products
Aniversario (golden high-end premium blend)
Don Armando (golden premium)
Añejo Selecto (golden mid-tier)
Reserva Especial
Dorado (golden low-tier)
Malla de Oro
Blanco (white low-tier)
Palo Viejo
Cristal
151 (white high-proof for mixing cocktails)
Limón (white low-tier lemon flavored)
London Dry Gin
Ginebra (Gin)
Vodka
Visage du Chat Toulousse Lautrec: Mint, Cream, Amaretto and Triple Sec (liqueur)
King's Label (whisky)
King's Label 12 años (whisky)

References

Brands of the Dominican Republic
Food and drink companies of the Dominican Republic
Distilleries
Rums